Requena-Utiel railway station is a railway station serving the Spanish towns of Requena and Utiel in the Valencian Community. It is served by the Spanish AVE high-speed rail system, on the Madrid–Levante high-speed rail network.

History
The station was built in 2010 at a cost of €12.4 million. It has been described as being "designed to favour rational use of energy. For this, energy efficiency, thermal insulation and energy saving criteria have been taken into account, so it will include thermal solar panels to produce hot water and photovoltaic panels to receive solar energy and transform it into electrical energy."
Since opening, the station has been criticised for being one of the least-used stations on the entire AVE network, with "less than 20 passengers a day" in 2016.

References

Railway stations in the Valencian Community
Railway stations in Spain opened in 2010
Requena-Utiel
Buildings and structures in the Province of Valencia